Mārtiņš Pluto (born 13 January 1998) is a Latvian racing cyclist, who currently rides for UCI Continental team . He competed in the road race at the 2021 UCI Road World Championships. He had his first win in a UCI race at the 2022 Midden–Brabant Poort Omloop.

Major results
2016
 1st  Time trial, National Junior Road Championships
2017
 3rd Road race, National Under-23 Road Championships
2018
 1st  Road race, National Under-23 Road Championships
 5th Road race, National Road Championships
2019
 1st Stage 5 Tour of Poyang Lake
2021
 6th Ster van Zwolle
 8th Kampioenschap van Vlaanderen
 9th Overall Tour of Estonia
2022
 1st Midden–Brabant Poort Omloop
 3rd Memoriał Andrzeja Trochanowskiego
 5th Overall Dookoła Mazowsza
 8th Puchar Ministra Obrony Narodowej

References

External links
 

1998 births
Living people
Latvian male cyclists
People from Jūrmala